Anita e Garibaldi is a 2013 Brazilian historical drama film directed by Alberto Rondalli. The film follows the arrival of Giuseppe Garibaldi in Brazil, his meeting with Anita Garibaldi and the human and military learning with Luigi Rossetti in the struggle for liberation of the state of Rio Grande do Sul and Santa Catarina of the Brazilian Empire.

Plot
Giuseppe Garibaldi (Gabriel Braga Nunes), 32, commander of the Republican rebels invading Laguna, Santa Catarina, during the Ragamuffin War (1835–1845), finds his soul mate Anita (Ana Paula Arósio), 18, wife of a local shoemaker. Between passion and battles, they define the direction of their lives and influence the course of the revolution.

Cast
 Ana Paula Arósio as Anita
 Gabriel Braga Nunes as Giuseppe Garibaldi
 Antonio Buil Pueyo as Luigi Rossetti
 Paulo Betti as voice of Luigi Rossetti
 Paulo César Pereio as Tio Duarte
 Hélio Cícero as General Canabarro
 Alexandre Rodrigues as Jacinto
 Leonardo Medeiros as Teixeira Nunes

References

External links
 

2010s historical drama films
Brazilian historical drama films
Films set in Brazil
Films set in the 19th century
Films about gauchos
Cultural depictions of Giuseppe Garibaldi
2013 drama films
2013 films
2010s Portuguese-language films